The Twin Sisters Peaks are mountains in Colorado, located in the Front Range in Larimer County, Colorado, straddling Rocky Mountain National Park and Roosevelt National Forest.

Historical names
Lillie Mountain
Lillie Mountains
Tahosa Mountain
Twin Sisters Peaks – 1908

See also

List of Colorado mountain ranges
List of Colorado mountain summits
List of Colorado fourteeners
List of Colorado 4000 meter prominent summits
List of the most prominent summits of Colorado
List of Colorado county high points

References

External links

Mountains of Rocky Mountain National Park
Mountains of Larimer County, Colorado
North American 3000 m summits